Thames-Coromandel District Council is the territorial authority for the Thames-Coromandel District of New Zealand. The council consists of the mayor of Thames-Coromandel and 8 ward councillors. There are also five community boards.

Composition

Councillors

 Mayor 
 Coromandel-Colville Ward: John Morrissey
 Mercury Bay Ward: Rekha Giri-Percival, Deli Connell, John Grant
 South East Ward: Gary Gotlieb, Terry Walker
 Thames Ward: Peter Revell, Martin Rodley, Robyn Sinclair

Community boards

 Coromandel-Colville Community Board: Jan Autumn, Jean Ashby, Kim Brett, Peter Pritchard
 Mercury Bay Community Board: Bill McLean, Deli Connell, Rekha Giri-Percival, Jeremy Lomas
 Tairua-Pauanui Community Board: Anne Stewart Ball, Chris New, Warwick Brooks, Barry Swindles
 Thames Community Board: Cherie Staples, Peter Revell, Sheryll Fitzpatrick, Strat Peters
 Whangamata Community Board: Dave Ryan, Kay Baker, Ken Coulam, Tamzin Letele

History

The area was under the authority of the Auckland Province government from 1853 to 1876.

It was divided into the territories of Coromandel County Council and Thames County Council from 1876 to 1975.

It came under the authority of the Thames/Coromandel District Council from 1975 to 1989.

The current council was established in 1989.

References

External links

 Official website

Thames-Coromandel District
Politics of Waikato
Territorial authorities of New Zealand